Faustino Javier Estrada González (born 4 August 1967) is a Mexican politician from the Ecologist Green Party of Mexico. From 2006 to 2009 he served as Deputy of the LX Legislature of the Mexican Congress representing Morelos.

References

1967 births
Living people
Politicians from Morelos
Ecologist Green Party of Mexico politicians
21st-century Mexican politicians
Universidad Iberoamericana alumni
Deputies of the LX Legislature of Mexico
Members of the Chamber of Deputies (Mexico) for Morelos